Glenkeel is a townland in County Fermanagh, Northern Ireland. It is situated in the south-west corner of the civil parish of Boho, in the land division of Old Barr, in the former barony of Magheraboy. It is situated within Fermanagh and Omagh district.

Glenkeel is divided into the sub-townlands of Carrickaphreghaun, Carricknaboll, Cloghernavea, Lough Acrottan, Teeroe and Tullyveeny.

This area is notable for its geological Karst features  notably forming part of the  Reyfad-Glenkeel cave system and  Reyfad-Carrickbeg system. Glenkeel hill is mentioned in several historical texts. The area still retains the tradition of peat cutting.

Etymology
Other historical forms/interpretations of the name Glenkeel have included An Gleann Caol, meaning "the glen of the slender person" (1833) or "the narrow glen" (Joyce, 1875).

Other authors have stated that the name may derive from Bragbaid-na-Caoile. The caol being after an  extraordinary monstrous serpent which  spent its days in Monaghan consuming a great deal of the local produce and then it would proceed  through  (gleann-na-Caoile (Glenkeel, near Louch Erne, on the western side, towards Leitrim) to a nighttime resting place. This continued until the arrival of St Patrick  who put an end to the serpent and its travels at Lough Derg.

See also 
 List of townlands in County Fermanagh

References 

Townlands of County Fermanagh
Fermanagh and Omagh district